Saint Aurea of Ostia (or Aura; in Greek, Chryse; both names mean “golden girl”) is venerated as the patron saint of Ostia.  According to one scholar, “[a]lthough the acta of Saint Aurea are pious fiction, she was a genuine martyr with a very early cultus at Ostia.”

Background
According to tradition, she was martyred sometime during the mid-third century, either during the reign of Roman Emperor Claudius Gothicus or Trebonianus Gallus.  Said to have been of royal or noble blood, Aurea was exiled from Rome to Ostia because she was a Christian.  In Ostia, she lived on an estate outside of the city walls and maintained contact with local Christians, including the bishop of Ostia, Cyriacus (Quiriacus).

Miracles associated with Aurea while she was in Ostia relate how a Christian prisoner named Censorinus had his chains miraculously loosened after he had been comforted by Aurea.  Seventeen soldiers converted to Christianity as a result of this miracle, and were later beheaded near Ostia's Arch of Caracalla.  Another legend states that Aurea and her friends also brought back to life the dead son of a shoemaker.  Ulpius Romulus executed Aurea's friends and tortured Aurea.  When she refused to sacrifice to the Roman gods, she was thrown into the sea with a stone tied around her neck.

Veneration
According to tradition, Aurea was buried on her estate in Ostia.  The church of Santa Aurea grew around her tomb.  The church was rebuilt in the 15th century.  A fragment of a Christian inscription that refers to Aurea was rediscovered near Santa Aurea in 1981 and later relocated to the castle of Ostia.  It reads: CHRYSE HIC DORM[IT] ("Chryse sleeps here").  "It may be her original funerary inscription," one scholar states, "but it may also have been added later to the tomb."  A marble column from perhaps the 5th century was discovered in 1950 near the same church.  It reads S.AVR.

References

External links
ACTA MARTYRUM AD OSTIA TIBERINA (Original Latin text, with English translation)

Italian Roman Catholic saints
3rd-century Christian martyrs
Year of birth unknown